

The Rio Grande City Port of Entry is located at the Rio Grande City – Camargo International Bridge. The bridge is owned, operated and maintained by the Starr Camargo Bridge Company.

History
. For much of the 20th century, a small ferry operation connected the cities of Camargo and Rio Grande City.  Finally in 1966, a bridge was built by the Starr Camargo Bridge Company. and a new border inspection station was built at that time.  The station was upgraded in 2000.

References

See also

 List of Mexico–United States border crossings
 List of Canada–United States border crossings

Mexico–United States border crossings
1905 establishments in Texas
Buildings and structures completed in 1966
Buildings and structures in Starr County, Texas